Sturla Ásgeirsson (born 20 July 1980) is an ex Icelandic handball player who played for Íþróttafélag Reykjavíkur in Iceland.

External links
 Sturla Ásgeirssons profile at hsg-duesseldorf.de

1980 births
Living people
Sturla Asgeirsson
Handball players at the 2008 Summer Olympics
Sturla Asgeirsson
Sturla Asgeirsson
Sturla Asgeirsson
Sturla Asgeirsson
Medalists at the 2008 Summer Olympics